Tamari Epitashvili (born 21 February 2000) is a Georgian footballer who plays as a forward for the Georgia women's national team.

International career
Epitashvili capped for Georgia at senior level during the UEFA Women's Euro 2022 qualifying.

References

2000 births
Living people
Women's footballers from Georgia (country)
Women's association football forwards
Georgia (country) women's international footballers